Platanthera bakeriana is a species of flowering plant in the family Orchidaceae, native from Nepal to China and Myanmar. It was first described in 1896 as Habenaria bakeriana.

Distribution
Platanthera bakeriana is native to Nepal, Tibet, the eastern Himalayas, south-central China (western and southern Sichuan and northern Yunnan) and Myanmar.

Conservation
Platanthera longiglandula was assessed as "vulnerable" in the 2004 IUCN Red List, where it is said to be native only to Sichuan in China. , P. longiglandula was regarded as a synonym of Platanthera bakeriana, which has a wider distribution.

References

bakeriana
Flora of South-Central China
Flora of East Himalaya
Flora of Myanmar
Flora of Nepal
Flora of Tibet
Plants described in 1896